DeForest George Buckner (born March 17, 1994) is an American football defensive tackle for the Indianapolis Colts of the National Football League (NFL). He played college football at Oregon, and was selected by the San Francisco 49ers in the first round of the 2016 NFL Draft. With the 49ers, Buckner made a Pro Bowl and was a second-team All-Pro selection in 2019. With the Colts, he was selected to the first-team All Pro in 2020 and made the Pro Bowl the following year.

Early years
Buckner was born to a Samoan mother and an African American father. He attended Punahou School in Honolulu, Hawaii, where he was rated as a four-star recruit. Buckner also was a teammate of Kaʻimi Fairbairn, currently the kicker of the Houston Texans. In January 2012, Buckner committed to the University of Oregon to play college football. Buckner also played basketball in high school.  He was the Hawaii Gatorade Player of the Year in basketball in 2012.

College career
Buckner played in all 13 games as a true freshman in 2012, making two starts. He finished his freshman season with 29 tackles, 2.5 for a loss, and 1.0 sack. As a sophomore in 2013, Buckner started eight of 13 games, recording 39 tackles, 3.5 for a loss, and 2.5 sacks. As a junior in 2014, he finished the year with 81 tackles, 13 for a loss, and 4.0 sacks. Buckner was considered a possible first-round pick in the NFL Draft but chose to return for his senior season to graduate and improve his draft stock. As a senior in 2015, Buckner improved even further, achieving career highs in tackles with 83, tackles for loss with 17, and sacks with 10.5.

Buckner was voted the 2015 Pac-12 Defensive Player of the Year by the Pac-12 coaches, joining Haloti Ngata as the second Oregon Duck to ever win the award. He was awarded the Morris Trophy for best Pac-12 defensive lineman (voted on by opposing players) and was named a first-team All-American. Following his senior season, Buckner officially announced he would enter the 2016 NFL Draft. He was considered one of the top-ranked defensive ends in the draft.

Professional career

San Francisco 49ers
The San Francisco 49ers selected Buckner with the seventh overall pick in the 2016 NFL Draft. He was the second consecutive Oregon defensive end selected in the first round by the 49ers, joining Arik Armstead who was selected 17th overall in 2015. They went on to draft Solomon Thomas who was another Pac-12 defensive end in 2017.

2016 season: Rookie year
Buckner made his NFL debut in the season-opener against the Los Angeles Rams, recording one tackle in the 28–0 shutout victory. During a Week 6 45-16 road loss to the Buffalo Bills, he recorded nine tackles and his first two NFL sacks on quarterback Tyrod Taylor and recovered a fumble forced by former college teammate Arik Armstead on Taylor. During Week 14 against the New York Jets, Buckner recorded a team-high 11 tackles and sacked Bryce Petty twice in the 23–17 overtime loss.

Buckner finished his rookie season with 73 tackles, six sacks, two fumble recoveries, and a pass deflection in 15 games and starts. He led all NFL defensive linemen with 1,108 snaps on the season and ranked second with his 73 tackles. Buckner's six sacks ranked fourth among rookies.

2017 season
Buckner and the defense played well against the Carolina Panthers in the season opener, holding quarterback Cam Newton to only 171 yards passing and three yards rushing despite losing 23–3. Three weeks later against the Arizona Cardinals, Buckner recorded four tackles and his first sack of the year on Carson Palmer during the 18–15 overtime road loss. During Week 15 against the Tennessee Titans, Buckner recorded a season-high nine tackles and half a sack on former college teammate Marcus Mariota in a narrow 25–23 victory.

Buckner finished his second professional season with 61 tackles, five pass deflections, three sacks, and a forced fumble in 16 games and starts.

2018 season
During the season-opener against the Minnesota Vikings, Buckner recorded seven tackles and sacked Kirk Cousins 2.5 times in the 24–16 road loss. In the next game against the Detroit Lions, he recorded five tackles and sacked Matthew Stafford once in a narrow 30–27 win. After the first two games of the season, Buckner eclipsed his 2017 sack total. During a Week 13 43-16 road loss the Seattle Seahawks, Buckner recorded seven tackles and sacked Russell Wilson twice. Two weeks later against the Seahawks, Buckner recorded a season-high 11 tackles and sacked Wilson twice more during the 26–23 overtime victory.

Buckner finished his third season with 67 tackles, three pass deflections, a fumble recovery, and a career high 12 sacks, the most by a 49ers player since Aldon Smith had 19.5 during the 2012 season. Buckner was named to his first Pro Bowl as a result.

2019 season

On April 24, 2019, the 49ers exercised the fifth-year option on Buckner's contract.

During Week 2 against the Cincinnati Bengals, Buckner recorded a tackle and his first sack of the season on Andy Dalton in the 41–17 road victory. In the next game against the Pittsburgh Steelers, Buckner recorded a season-high 10 tackles, sacked Mason Rudolph once, and recovered a fumble forced by teammate Arik Armstead on James Conner late in the fourth quarter to help seal a 24–20 victory. After a Week 4 bye, the 49ers hosted the Cleveland Browns on Monday Night Football. In that game, Buckner recorded five tackles and a strip sack on Baker Mayfield which was recovered by teammate Nick Bosa as the 49ers won by a score of 31–3. During a Week 9 28-25 road victory over the Arizona Cardinals, Buckner recorded four tackles and a sack. In the next ganme against the Seattle Seahawks on Monday Night Football, he recorded five tackles and recovered a fumble forced by teammate K'Waun Williams on running back Rashaad Penny. Later in the game, Buckner recovered a fumble lost by offensive tackle Germain Ifedi and returned it for a 12-yard touchdown during the 27–24 overtime loss. Three weeks later against the Baltimore Ravens, Buckner sacked Lamar Jackson once during the 20–17 road loss. With this sack, Buckner recorded at least one sack in every game against the AFC North during the season.

Buckner finished the 2019 season with 61 tackles, 7.5 sacks, two forced fumbles, four fumble recoveries, two pass deflections, and a touchdown in 16 games and starts. On January 3, 2020, he was named as a Second-team All-Pro.

Buckner made his playoff debut in the NFC Divisional Round of the playoffs against the Minnesota Vikings. In that game, he recorded two tackles and sacked Kirk Cousins once in the 27–10 win. During the NFC Championship Game against the Green Bay Packers, Buckner recorded four tackles and recovered a fumble lost by Aaron Rodgers in the 37–20 victory. During Super Bowl LIV against the Kansas City Chiefs, Buckner recorded six tackles and sacked Patrick Mahomes 1.5 times in the 31–20 loss.

Indianapolis Colts
On March 18, 2020, the 49ers traded Buckner to the Indianapolis Colts in exchange for their first round pick in the 2020 NFL Draft. He then signed a four-year, $84 million contract extension, making him the second-highest paid defensive tackle.

2020 season
During a Week 2 28-11 over the Minnesota Vikings, Buckner recorded his first sack of the season on Kirk Cousins in the end zone for a safety. During Week 11 against the Green Bay Packers, Buckner recovered a fumble forced by teammate Julian Blackmon on wide receiver Marquez Valdes-Scantling early in overtime to help the Colts win the game 34–31. Buckner was placed on the reserve/COVID-19 list after testing positive for the virus on November 25, 2020. and activated on December 4. During Week 15 against the Houston Texans had a career-high three sacks on Deshaun Watson, including a strip sack that was recovered by the Colts, during the 27–20 road victory, earning AFC Defensive Player of the Week.
Buckner was named the AFC Defensive Player of the Month for his performance in December.

Buckner finished his first season with the Colts with 58 tackles, 9.5 sacks, three pass deflections, two forced fumbles, and a fumble recovery in 15 games and 14 starts. On January 8, 2021, Buckner was named a first-team All-Pro for the 2020 season.

2021 season
During the season-opener against the Seattle Seahawks, Buckner recorded six tackles and sacked Russell Wilson once in the 28-16 loss. During a Week 6 31-3 victory over the Houston Texans, he recorded five tackles and a sack. In the next game against the San Francisco 49ers, Buckner recorded six tackles and a sack in the 30-18 road victory. The following week against the Tennessee Titans, Buckner recorded two tackles and a sack in the 34-31 overtime loss. During a Week 12 38-31 loss to the Tampa Bay Buccaneers, Buckner recorded three tackles and a sack. Three weeks later against the New England Patriots, he recorded four tackles and a sack in the 27-17 victory. On December 22, 2021, Buckner was named to his second Pro Bowl.

Buckner finished the 2021 season with 68 tackles, seven sacks, and three pass deflections in 17 games and 16 starts.

NFL career statistics

Personal life
Buckner is married to Ashlyn Buckner. They have one son together.

References

External links
San Francisco 49ers bio
Oregon Ducks bio

1994 births
Living people
People from Honolulu County, Hawaii
Players of American football from Hawaii
American sportspeople of Samoan descent
American football defensive tackles
American football defensive ends
Oregon Ducks football players
Punahou School alumni
Indianapolis Colts players
San Francisco 49ers players
African-American players of American football
21st-century African-American sportspeople
American Conference Pro Bowl players
National Conference Pro Bowl players